Godwin Igwebuike (born September 10, 1994) is an American football running back for the Seattle Seahawks of the National Football League (NFL). He played college football at Northwestern.

Professional career

Tampa Bay Buccaneers
Igwebuike was signed by the Tampa Bay Buccaneers as an undrafted free agent on April 30, 2018. At this point in his career, he played safety. He was waived on September 1, 2018, and was signed to the practice squad the next day. He was promoted to the active roster on November 16, 2018. He was waived on November 26, 2018.

San Francisco 49ers
On November 27, 2018, Igwebuike was claimed off waivers by the San Francisco 49ers. He was waived on April 29, 2019.

Philadelphia Eagles
Igwebuike was claimed off waivers by the Philadelphia Eagles on April 30, 2019. He was waived on August 2, 2019.

New York Jets
On August 4, 2019, Igwebuike was claimed off waivers by the New York Jets. He was waived on August 31, 2019.

Seattle Dragons
Igwebuike was selected by the Seattle Dragons in the 2020 XFL Supplemental Draft on November 22, 2019. He had his contract terminated when the league suspended operations on April 10, 2020.

Detroit Lions
On January 14, 2021, Igwebuike signed a reserve/futures contract with the Detroit Lions. The Lions converted him to running back two weeks before training camp, and he made the active roster to start the season. He scored his first career touchdown on a 42-yard run on November 14, 2021, against the Pittsburgh Steelers.

On August 30, 2022, Igwebuike was waived by the Lions.

Seattle Seahawks
On September 28, 2022, Igwebuike was signed to the Seattle Seahawks practice squad. On December 26, 2022, Igwebuike was signed to the Seattle Seahawks active roster.

Personal life
Igwebuike is a first cousin, once removed to former NFL kicker Donald Igwebuike.

References

External links
Detroit Lions bio
Northwestern Wildcats bio

1994 births
American football safeties
American sportspeople of Nigerian descent
Detroit Lions players
Living people
New York Jets players
Northwestern Wildcats football players
People from Pickerington, Ohio
Philadelphia Eagles players
Players of American football from Ohio
San Francisco 49ers players
Seattle Dragons players
Seattle Seahawks players
Tampa Bay Buccaneers players